Chundan vallam ('beaked boat'), known outside Kerala as Kerala snake boats, are one of the icons of Kerala culture used in the Vallamkali or boat race.

Naval architecture
Constructed according to specifications taken from the Sthapatya Veda, an ancient treatise for the building of wooden boats, these boats vary from 100 to 138 feet in length.  With the rear portion rising to a height of about 20 feet, and a long tapering front portion, it resembles a snake with its hood raised.  Hulls are built of planks precisely 83 feet in length and six inches wide.  The boats are a good example of ancient vishwakarma' prowess in naval architecture.

Traditions and customs
Traditionally each boat belongs to a village, and the villagers worship that boat like a deity. Only men are allowed to touch the boat, and to show respect they should be barefooted. To make the boat slippery while in the water and to reduce absorption of water and thereby reduce the resistance of the hull, it is oiled with a mixture of fish oil, the ash of coconut shells, and eggs. 
Repair work is done annually by the village carpenter.

Capacity and usage
Traditionally a boat will be commanded by a village leader (kaarnavan or karanaadhan) with first adanayampu, and under him there will be three main paddlers who control the movement of the boat with a  main rudder-oar (adanayampu).  Sitting two to a row along the length of the boat, there will be 64 paddlers, representing 64 art forms (or on occasion 128 paddlers).  They row in rhythm of the vanchipattu ('boat[man's] song').  There will be around 25 singers in a row at the middle between the paddlers.  In the middle of the second half of the boat is a platform for eight people to stand from where the cantor will lead the song.  They represent the Ashtadikpalakas (Devas or gods who guard the eight directions).

See also

Vallam kali
Aranmula Boat Race
Aranmula Kannadi
Kallada Boat Race
Dragon boat
Waka
Swan boat (racing)
Nouka Baich

References

Boat races in Kerala
Paddling
Monuments of National Importance in Kerala
Canoes